Bimi or BIMI may refer to
Bimi-ye Sofla, a village in Iran
Baptist International Missions, Inc. (BIMI)
Bimi Ombale (1952–2011), Congolese singer, drummer and songwriter
Larry Bimi (died 2011), Ghanaian lawyer and public official
Brand Indicators for Message Identification (BIMI)
A registered trade mark under which sprouting broccoli produce also referred to as Broccolini is sold